Zahran, also known as Banū ʿZahrān ibn Kaʿab, is one of the oldest Arabian tribes in the Arabian Peninsula. It is regarded as one of the largest tribes in Al Bahah Province.

Al Baha is the homeland of Zahran and Ghamid. However, many tribes that descend from Zahran and Azd migrated to Oman and Tanukh (Levant) under leadership of Malik bin Fehm in the 3rd century. Oman’s modern royal family, Al Said, is said to descend from Zahran through Malik ibn Fehm. Moreover, many currently live in Mecca, Jeddah, Riyadh, and Dammam due to large migration from villages and small cities during the 1960s and '70s in search of a better life.

Zahran is a well-known tribe before and after Islam. Many of them left their houses, homes and relatives and joined the prophet Mohammed in Medina.
Zahrani is also a leading tribe in Pakistan especially in Punjab and Sindh . They migrated from Iran to Pakistan during golden era of islam.

Name
Zahran (Arabic: زهران) is the name of the shared common ancestor of Zahran. Etymological sources indicate that it is of Arabic Semitic origin, meaning “bright” and “pure”.

Islamic Prophecy
There are Islamic prophecies with regards to 'End-Times' that have quoted the tribe; like the following by Abu Hurairah:Abu Hurairah said, “I heard the Prophet say, The Hour will not come until the buttocks of the women of Daws move (quiver) while going around Dhu l-Khalasah”. Dhu l-Khalasah was an idol worshiped by the tribe of Daws and neighboring clans during the Jahiliyyah. (Hadith from Bukhari.) And Dhu l-Khalasah is named after Khalasah: a valley in Zahran’s homeland, specifically in Daws, one of the biggest clans in Zahran.

Recent History
The author of Kitab Akhbar Makka Lil’Azraqi (Azraqi’s Revisioned Book of Reports about Mecca), mentions that the local clans in the region used to re-honor Dhu l-Khalasah in the early 20th century and slay tributes to it, where the prominent Saudi geographic researcher: Rushdi Saleh Malhas, dedicated a section under the title "Security Crisis and Return to Dhu l-Khalasah" to comment on the issue of "Dhu l-Khalasah": “When the security cord in the Arabian Peninsula was dimished in recent times and its residents lacked comfort and tranquility, and poverty and destitution prevailed in the land, souls felt the desire for asceticism and faith, and the need for a refuge to which they dread, so local clans returned to their first Jahiliyyah, by re-honoring Dhu l-Khalasah, clinging to heresies and superstitions.”  

During the emergence of the third/modern Saudi state between 1341- 1344 Hijri / 1921 - 1925 AD, Dhu l-Khalasah was destroyed by order of king Abdulaziz, otherwise known as Ibn Saud. The order was carried in delegation by Abdulaziz Al Ibrahim, where he led a campaign that demolished most of the image cult and threw its ruins into a nearby valley. One of those who engaged in the campaign emphasized that the structure of Dhul-Khalasa was immensely strong, stating that the force of dozens of men was required  to move a single stone, and that its durability indicates considerate tactful building skills.

Branches

Banu Daws comprises three divisions: Banu Manhib, Banu Fahm and Banu Ali.
Banu 'Amr includes four divisions: Banu Bashir, Banu Harir, Banu Jundob and Banu 'Adwan (Banu 'Adwan occupied Adwan village in Syria and gave the village its name).
Banu Aws includes five divisions: Banu Hasan, Bal-Khirmar, Banu Kinanah (not to be confused with Banu Kinanah), Banu 'Amir (not to be confused with Banu 'Amir) and Ahl Baydan.

Ibn Battuta’s Report
The traveler Ibn Battuta (703-779 Hijri) mentioned in his journey the conditions of the Holy Mosque, Mecca, its people, and their neighbors from the Hijaz Mountains: “And the peoples near Mecca such as Bajila, Zahran, and Ghamid take the initiative of participating in the Rajab Umrah and are major producers for the supply chain of seeds, ghee, honey, raisin, oils, natural fertilizer, and Almond. Able to manipulate and decrease prices effectively , making the people of Mecca very much well-off. It’s to be noted that the people of Mecca endured death of livestock and decrease in livelihood when they  (Bajila, Zahran, and Ghamid) changed their trade route or had a less fruitful harvest seasons, but if not, Mecca became fertile, blessings appeared in it, and its economy flourished. When they (Bajila, Zahran, and Ghamid) lazed on about their trade seasons and pre-planned journeys, the women would gather and chivvy them on; and this’s truly of God’s blessings and kindness, to care to the conditions of these lands and its peoples in the Hijaz Mountains of Bajila, Zahran, Ghamid, and other tribes, fertile with many grapes, abundant yields, with rich history and an eloquent classical Arabic linguistic tongue, a tongue that speaks truthfully to what it utters, and a heart that has but sincere intentions and good faith. When they perform Tawaf during their Umrah they voice Duas that speak to the heart and swell eyes of tears of even the most ill-hearted, making people around them stretching out their arms, in faith and reverence of their supplications and Duas to God. And if they came to Mecca, the Bedouins of the road obscured away from their path and avoided their objection, those who accompanied them from the visitors praised their company. Prophet Muhammad ﷺ mentioned them in good heart and praised them, saying: ‘Teach them of blessings, and they will teach you of Dua.’. It is also mentioned that  Abdullah ibn Omar ibn Al Khattab, may God be pleased with him, used to seek the time of their Tawaf and enter their grouping to be blessed by their Dua and their holy affair, for mercy is poured upon them plentifully.”

Zahrani Arabic dialect
Zahrani Arabic dialect is closely related to standard Arabic language. Ahmed Abdul Ghafur Attar, a Saudi poet and linguist, said in an article that the language of the Hejaz, especially that which is spoken in Belad Ghamdi and Zahran, is close to the Classical Language.

Faisal Ghori (Arabic فيصل غوري), a famous scholar of Arabic literature, in his book Qabayil Al- Hejaz (Hejazi tribes) wrote: "We can say is that there are some tribes in Arabia whose language today much closer to the classical Arabic language. The tribes of Belad Ghamid and Zahran are a good example of this."

Zahrani tribal governance
Members of the tribe in Al Baha elected their tribal chief in 2006, the first election of its kind in Saudi Arabia. Mohammad Bin Yahya Al Zahrani won the election.

Notable People 
Abu Hurairah, one of the sahabah (companions) of Muhammad
Ibn Duraid, Abbasid poet
Fatimah bint Sa’ad, third great grandmother of the Islamic prophet Muhammad
Malik ibn Fehm, pre-Islamic king and founder of Oman and Tanukh
Āmir Al Jadir (translation: Aamir the wall-mason), is said to be the first to reconstruct the walls of the Kaaba after Abraham and Ishmael and is the father of the clan of Banu Āmir
Jadhima Al Abrash,  king of Tanukh and son of Malik Bin Fehm 
Suleimah ibn Malik, infamous for killing his father Malik Bin Fehm then escaping to and ruling Kerman in ancient Persia
Jamaz ibn Malik, pre-Islamic poet and king
Al-Khalil ibn Ahmad al-Farahidi, Arabian lexicographer and philologist
Ahmed ibn Sa’eed Al Busaidi, Imam and founder of the Al Busaid Dynasty (House of Al Said)
Musaddid ibn Msrahid, hadith narrator and imam
Bakhroosh ibn A’llaas , tribal sheikh and Saudi military commander in the Saudi-Ottoman War
Omar Abdulaziz, famous Saudi dissident video blogger and activist. His story features prominently in the film The Dissident (2020).

See also
 Azd
 House of Busaid
 House of Ya'rub
 Tanukhids
 Abu Hurairah
 Ghamid
 Hejaz

References

Tribes of Arabia
Tribes of Saudi Arabia
Azd
Qahtanites